is a Japanese actress.

Career 
In 1990, she successfully passed an audition called Horipro Talent Scout Caravan(Ja).

Personal life 
She had graduated from Tamagawa University.

Her sister was an actress, and her brother Kōhei Toda (Ja: 戸田康平, Toda Kōhei) is a singer and songwriter.
In August 2010, she married her husband, a doctor she met through mutual friends.

In the following August 2011. she announced she was pregnant with her first child and she gave birth to her daughter in February 2012. Toda has stated that she plans to continue her career after childbirth.

Filmography

TV dramas

Galápagos (2023)

Movies

 Natsu no niwa - The Friends (1994)
 Blooming Again (2004)
 The Craft of Memories (2020)
 The Woman of S.R.I. the Movie (2021), Mikie Shiba
 And So the Baton Is Passed (2021)
 Takatsu-gawa (2022)
 Akira and Akira (2022)
 Silent Parade (2022), Machiko Namiki
 The Master Sake Brewers (2022)
 Do Unto Others (2023)

References

External links 
Horipro page

1974 births
Living people
Actors from Hiroshima
Japanese film actresses
Japanese television actresses
Asadora lead actors
20th-century Japanese actresses
21st-century Japanese actresses